Sankata Boys Sports Club, commonly known as Sankata Club, is a Nepalese professional football club based in Kathmandu, that competes in the Martyr's Memorial A-Division League. Named after Sankata Temple, the club has won the national championship three times, most recently in 1985.

History
Being a successful club in the 1980s, Sankata won the title of the national championship in 1980, 1983 and 1985.
Due to poor performance just winning five games out of 22 in A-Division league 2010  the club was relegated to Martyr's Memorial B-Division League after 38 years. However, the team won the 2011 Martyr's Memorial B-Division League and since is playing in Nepal's highest league. In 2019, the team became runners-up in the 2018–19 league, making it the best season of the club since the 1980s, in what The Kathmandu Post called a "stunning" performance.

Honours
Martyr's Memorial A-Division League
Winners: 1980, 1983, 1985

 Martyr's Memorial B-Division League
Winners: 1958, 2011

Tribhuvan Challenge Shield
Winners: 1979

Simara Gold Cup
Winners: 2073, 2078

Rhino Gold Cup
Winners: 2074

Budha Subba Gold Cup
Runners-up: 2017

Aaha! Gold Cup
Winners: 2077, 2079

Birat Gold Cup
Winners: 2069

ANFA Cup
Runners-up: 2014

Squads

Current squad

League finishes

References

Football clubs in Nepal
1954 establishments in Nepal
Association football clubs established in 1954